Citadel/UX (typically referred to simply as "Citadel") is a collaboration suite (messaging and groupware) that is descended from the Citadel family of programs which became popular in the 1980s and 1990s as a bulletin board system platform.  It is designed to run on open source operating systems such as Linux or BSD.  Although it is being used for many bulletin board systems, in 1998 the developers began to expand its functionality to a general purpose groupware platform.

In order to modernize the Citadel platform for the Internet, the Citadel/UX developers added functionality such as shared calendars, instant messaging, and built-in implementations of Internet protocols such as SMTP, IMAP, Sieve, POP3, GroupDAV and XMPP.  All protocols offer OpenSSL encryption for additional security.

Users of Citadel/UX systems also have available to them a web-based user interface which employs Ajax style functionality to allow application-like interaction with the system.

Citadel uses the Berkeley DB database for all of its data stores, including the message base.

Citadel/UX became free and open-source software subject to the terms of the GPL-2.0-or-later license in 1998. In 2006 Citadel was relicensed to the GPL-2.0-only license. In 2007 Citadel was relicensed again to the GPL-3.0-only license.

References

External links
 
 Review of Citadel by Carla Schroder of Enterprise Networking Planet: Part 1 Part 2
 Mod_auth_citadel, an Apache Web Server authentication module for Citadel by Stuart Cianos

Free groupware
Bulletin board system software
Collaborative software for Linux
Ajax (programming)
Free email server software
Free email software
Free content management systems
Formerly proprietary software